Jason Rogers (born April 14, 1983) is an American saber fencer.

Fencing career
Rogers was born in Houston, Texas. At the urging of his parents, he began to learn fencing at the Westside Fencing Center under the tutelage of his coach, Daniel Costin. He currently fences for the Los Angeles International Fencing Center.

Rogers graduated from Brentwood School (Los Angeles, California) in Los Angeles, California in 2001. He signed with Ohio State University, where he was the NCAA sabre bronze medalist in 2002 and 2003. He graduated summa cum laude with a Bachelor of Science Degree in Psychology ın 2006.

He competed in Athens and fenced in the Beijing Olympics for both the team and individual tournaments in Sabre. In the 2008 Beijing Olympics, he helped the USA sabre team win the quarterfinals against Hungary and semifinals against Russia. His substitute, James Williams, was called into a fence in Roger's place in the gold medal bout.

Some of hıs career highlights include bronze in the individual saber at the 2003 Pan Am Games and beıng a member of gold-medal U.S. team as well as winning a bronze medal at the Grand Prix World Cup in Plovdiv, Bulgaria in 2007.

Awards and honors
2004, 2008 U.S. Olympic Team Member
2008 Grand Prix in Las Vegas, Nev., Sixth Place Team
2007 Grand Prix World Cup in Plovdiv, Bulgaria, Bronze Medal
2007 U.S. National Championships, Gold Medal Team
2004 Grand Prix World Cup in New York, N.Y., Gold Medal Team
2003 Pan American Men's Sabre, Bronze Medal
2003 Senior "A" World Cup ın Madrid, SPA, Eighth Place

Miscellaneous 
In 2009, Jason Rogers and Tim Morehouse were on the cover of the New York Post as two of New York City's Most Eligible Bachelors.

References

External links
 Team USA Website: Jason Rogers
 U.S. Fencing Media: Jason Rogers

1983 births
Living people
American male sabre fencers
Sportspeople from Houston
Fencers at the 2004 Summer Olympics
Fencers at the 2008 Summer Olympics
Olympic silver medalists for the United States in fencing
Medalists at the 2008 Summer Olympics
Pan American Games bronze medalists for the United States
Pan American Games medalists in fencing
Fencers at the 2003 Pan American Games
Brentwood School (Los Angeles) alumni
Medalists at the 2003 Pan American Games